Buima was a Basoga chiefdom in what is today Uganda. It was founded before 1818 and lasted until the end of the nineteenth century.

References
Busoga Predecessor States

History of Uganda